The Dual Analog Controller (SCPH-1150 in Japan, SCPH-1180 in the United States, and SCPH-1180e in Europe) is Sony's first handheld analog controller for the PlayStation, and the predecessor to the DualShock. Its first official analog controller was the PlayStation Analog Joystick (SCPH-1110).

History
The Dual Analog Controller was first displayed under glass at the PlayStation Expo 96–97, which was held from 1 November to 4 November 1996. It was released in Japan in April 1997, coincident with the Japanese releases of analog-capable titles Tobal 2 and Bushido Blade. It was advertised as allowing for more precise and fluid control of the games' fighters, with the rumble feature contributing to a more realistic experience.

Before its release in the United States, Sony decided that vibration feedback would be removed from the European and American versions of the controller. According to a Sony spokesperson, "We evaluated all the features and decided, for manufacturing reasons, that what was most important to gamers was the analog feature." Reasons for dropping the vibration feedback reportedly included its being linked to premature malfunction of the controllers. There were rumors that Nintendo had attempted to legally block the release of the controller in North America due to the vibration feature's similarity to Nintendo's Rumble Pak, but Nintendo firmly denied that it had taken any form of legal action over Sony's controllers. Moreover, according to the United States Patent Office, two employees of Atari Games have held a patent on vibrating game controller technology since March 1991. Another theory for the vibration feedback being dropped was that Sony simply wanted to keep the price of the controller down so as to maximize user adoption.

It was released in the United States on 27 August  1997, and in Europe in September 1997 with little promotion. A few months later, the first DualShock controller was released in Japan on 20 November 1997.

Namco had already released an analog controller for PlayStation called NeGcon.  Sony's Dual Analog Controller's analog mode was not compatible with the NeGcon-compatible games such as Wipeout and Ridge Racer. However, Need for Speed II, Gran Turismo, and Gran Turismo 2 feature compatibility with both NeGcon and Dual Analog control schemes.

Fans of a smaller form factor, Japanese players complained that the very long hand grips made the controller too large to be held properly and the lack of a rumble feature in the U.S. and European models are the most commonly cited reasons that Sony decided to end production of this controller and redesign it. This redesign eventually became the DualShock.

The Dual Analog controller was discontinued in all three markets in 1998, to be replaced by the DualShock.

Features
The Dual Analog controller has three modes of operation: Digital, which disables the Analog sticks, Analog (as also found on DualShock/DualShock 2 controllers) and an Analog Flightstick mode emulating the PlayStation Analog Joystick that is not available on the DualShock or DualShock 2.

If a PlayStation game is DualShock or Dual Analog compatible, the player may press the Analog button located between the two analog sticks to activate the analog mode. This is indicated by a red LED. If the Dual Analog controller is switched to analog mode while using a game which is not analog-compatible, the game will not register any button presses or, in some cases, the game will consider the controller to be detached, this in part due to the fact the controller's type ID that is reported to the game is changed when the button is pressed.

The ability to emulate Sony's own PlayStation Analog Joystick by pressing the "Analog" button a second time to reveal a green LED (this was commonly referred to as "Flightstick Mode") provided a less expensive alternative to the FlightStick Analog Joystick and retailed for an average of US$35 compared to the Flightstick's retail price of US$70.

Similarly to the Nintendo 64 controller, the Dual Analog Controller was designed to be held in four different ways: standard control, in which the left thumb uses the directional buttons and the right thumb uses the action buttons; analog control, in which the left thumb uses the left analog stick and the right thumb uses the action buttons; dual analog control, which imitates the Dual Analog Joystick, with both thumbs positioned over the analog sticks, and the shoulder buttons used instead of the action buttons; and analog-digital control, in which the left thumb uses the directional buttons, the right thumb uses the right analog stick, and the shoulder buttons are again used for actions.

MechWarrior 2, Ace Combat 2, Descent Maximum, and Colony Wars were among the shortlist of twenty-seven PlayStation Flightstick compatible games.

Differences from DualShock

The Dual Analog controller features several aspects that remain exclusive to it, and were scrapped or redesigned for the release of the DualShock controller.
 Only the Japanese version features a vibration feedback function. The European and American versions of the controller do however include circuitry and mounts for a rumble motor, a possible leftover from the Japanese version of the controller, and therefore installing the motor is a simple process. Due to a lack of vibration-compatible games at the time, the European and American versions were not shipped with rumble feedback and, as a result, weigh significantly less than their overseas counterpart, and fall somewhere between the weights of the standard controller and the DualShock.
 The hand grips are  longer than the original controller and the later DualShock controller. The body of the controller is also wider, spacing the pads slightly farther apart. This wider controller body has been retained on the DualShock and all later PlayStation controllers.
 The L2 and R2 buttons have ridges at the top edge to easily distinguish them from the L1 and R1 buttons and are spaced farther apart than the original controller or DualShock.
 The L2 and R2 buttons are also wider than the standard controller but shorter than the DualShock.
 The analog sticks are concave and lack the rubberised coating that has been used on the DualShock and later controllers.
 In addition to the standard digital mode and the regular "red LED" Analog mode, there is a third mode that emulates the layout of Sony's own PlayStation Analog Joystick, and is indicated by a green LED. This feature is missing on the DualShock.
 The "Analog" button, used for switching modes, is raised instead of recessed like the DualShock's button and can be more easily hit accidentally.
 The Analog mode cannot be changed or locked by software as it can with the DualShock controller and later.
 The Dual Analog's rumble circuit will not respond to PlayStation 2 software even if a rumble motor is installed.

References

External links
 "Was this long-lost relative of the Dual Shock a better controller?" by The Next Level.
 ncsx.com product page
 Review by vidgames.com

Game controllers
PlayStation (console) accessories